The Agrour Amogjar is a 690 m high peak near the Amogjar Pass, in the Adrar plateau of central Mauritania. Its small natural shelters house a rich collection of rock paintings in a damaged state. An enclosure protects some of the shelters and access is subject to a fee.

Rock paintings
The set of rock paintings is heterogeneous. Eight stylistic groups have been recorded, ranging from the "pastoral" period to the most recent graffiti. The panels are featuring geometric circles with sunburst design, handprints, naturalistic wildlife such as giraffe, lion and crocodile, as well as herds of cattle and human collective scenes. The most important set is a frieze of dancers.

Gallery

References

Adrar Region
Archaeological sites in Mauritania
History of Mauritania
Saharan rock art
Caves of Mauritania
Archaeological sites of Western Africa